The 2001 World's Strongest Man was the 24th edition of World's Strongest Man and was won by Svend Karlsen from Norway. It was his first title after finishing second the previous year. 1998 winner Magnus Samuelsson from Sweden  finished second after finishing third the previous year, and 2000 winner Janne Virtanen from Finland finished third. The contest was held at Victoria Falls, Zambia.

Qualifying heats

Heat 1

Magnus Ver Magnusson of Iceland was originally intended to be within this Heat but had to withdraw making room for the reserve Israel Garrido.

events: Carry & Drag (Duck Walk & Drag Chain & Anchor), Arm Over Arm Train Pull, Africa Stone, Max Deadlift, Stone Circle (Connan Circle), Atlas Stones

Heat 2

events: Carry & Drag (Duck Walk & Drag Chain & Anchor), Fingal's Fingers, Arm Over Arm Train Pull, Hercules Hold, Max Deadlift, Atlas Stones

Heat 3

events: Carry & Flip (Farmer's Walk & Tyre Flip), Arm Over Arm Train Pull, Africa Stone, Max Deadlift, Stone Circle (Connan Circle), Atlas Stones

Heat 4

Bill Lyndon of Australia was originally intended to be within this Heat but had to withdraw making room for the Levi Vaoga who was not down as an official reserve.

events: Carry & Drag (Duck Walk & Drag Chain & Anchor), Arm Over Arm Train Pull, Africa Stone, Max Deadlift, Stone Circle (Connan Circle), Atlas Stones

Heat 5

events: Carry & Flip (Farmer's Walk & Tyre Flip), Fingal's Fingers, Arm Over Arm Train Pull, Hercules Hold, Max Deadlift, Atlas Stones

Reserves
Israel Garrido  - used (Heat 1)
Brian Bell 
Chad Coy

Final results

References

External links
 Official site

2001 in sports
World's Strongest Man
2001 in Zambian sport